The following are the national records in track cycling in Turkmenistan, maintained by its national cycling federation, Cycling Federation of Turkmenistan.

Men

Women

References

Turkmenistan
records
track cycling
track cycling